XHIGA-FM is a radio station on 93.9 FM in Iguala, Guerrero. It is owned by Radio Cañón.

History
XHIGA received its concession on September 15, 1991. It was initially owned by María del Carmen Ibarra Fariña, an executive at Grupo ACIR. In 2008, ACIR sold the station to ABC Radio.

References

Radio stations in Guerrero
Radio stations established in 1991